
Clement Drew (1806–1889) was an artist and "dealer in picture-frames" in Boston, Massachusetts, in the 19th century. He specialized in marine paintings. He kept a studio on Court Street (ca.1840s-1860s), Tremont Street (in the Boston Museum building, ca.1873), Copeland Street (ca.1888), and Tremont Temple (1889). He married Elizabeth Teal in 1829; they had two children.

Among the subjects painted by Drew: "Abaellino privateer, 1812"; Bark Vernon on Lynn Beach, Morning, Feby. 3rd, 1859; Brig Vintage (built 1837); missionary packet Morning Star Minot's Light; "the ship Abolition and the wreck Colonization, 1839;" sailing ship Uriel; yacht passing Thatcher Island Lights, Cape Ann; Ship Mary L. Sutton; Ship Hound; and wreck of the Schooner Hesperus on Norman's Woe, Gloucester, Massachusetts, 1883.

Images

References

Further reading

External links

 WorldCat. Drew, Clement 1806-1889
 Mystic Seaport, Connecticut. Works by C. Drew.
The Mariners' Museum

1806 births
1889 deaths
Artists from Boston
19th century in Boston
American marine artists
19th-century American painters
American male painters
Cultural history of Boston
19th-century American male artists